The Taipei Film Festival (TFF) is a film festival promoted by the city of Taipei, Taiwan, through the Department of Cultural Affairs of the Taipei City Government. It was first held in 1998, from September 28 to October 5.
Currently chaired by cinematographer Mark Lee Ping Bin, Taipei Film Festival is the only festival in Taiwan that offers a New Talent Competition for aspiring directors from around the world and a Taipei Awards competition for Taiwanese filmmakers.

The Festival screens around 200 films from more than 30 countries worldwide. With approximately 100,000 attendants each year, Taipei Film Festival has become one of the most influential film festivals in the Chinese-speaking world.

History
Due to the COVID-19 pandemic the 2020 Taipei Film Festival was the first in-person film festival to be held that year worldwide.

Competition sections 
International New Talent Competition - Films in this section must be a director's first or second feature.
Grand Prize
Special Jury Prize
Audience’s Choice Award
Taipei Film Awards - Competition for Taiwanese filmmakers.
Grand Prize
Best Narrative Feature
Best Documentary
Best Short Film
Best Animation
Best Director
Best Actor
Best Actress
Best Supporting Actor
Best Supporting Actress
Best New Talent
Best Screenplay
Award for an Outstanding Artistic Contribution
Audience Choice Award
Outstanding Contribution Award

International New Talent Competition

Grand Prize winners

Taipei Film Awards

Grand Prize winners

See also
Women Make Waves is a longer-established film festival, in Taiwan since 1993, and the largest women's film festival in Asia. Since 2005, there is also an annual Asian Lesbian Film and Video Festival in Taipei City, and since 2014, the annual Taiwan International Queer Film Festival in Taipei City and two other major cities, founded and directed by Jay Lin.

 Culture of Taiwan
 Golden Horse Film Festival and Awards
 Taiwan International Queer Film Festival
 Women Make Waves

References

External links
 Taipei Film Festival official website

Taiwanese film awards
Film festivals in Taiwan
Recurring events established in 1998
1998 establishments in Taiwan